Ejupi is a surname. Notable people with this surname include:

 Albert Ejupi (born 1992), Swedish football player
 Elizabeta Ejupi (born 1994), Albanian football player
 Leonora Ejupi (born 2000), Kosovar football player
 Muzafer Ejupi (born 1988), Macedonian football player